Something Else!!!! (subtitled The Music of Ornette Coleman) is the debut album by jazz saxophonist Ornette Coleman. It was released by Contemporary Records in September 1958. According to AllMusic, the album "shook up the jazz world", revitalizing the union of blues and jazz and restoring "blues to their 'classic' beginnings in African music". It is unusual in Coleman's output in that it features a conventional bebop quintet instrumentation (saxophone, cornet, piano, bass and drums); after this album, Coleman would omit the piano, creating a starker and more fluid sound.

History
While working as an elevator operator in a department store in Los Angeles, Ornette assembled a group of musicians—teenaged cornet player Don Cherry, double bass player Charlie Haden, and drummers Ed Blackwell and Billy Higgins—with whom he could explore his unusual jazz compositions. Coleman was introduced to music producer Lester Koenig of Contemporary Records by a bebop bassist friend of Cherry's, Red Mitchell, who thought Koenig might be interested in purchasing Coleman's songs. When other musicians found the tunes too challenging, Coleman was invited to perform the compositions himself.

Critical opinion

Though often controversial at the time, music from Coleman's first album is now generally well received. Rolling Stone commented admiringly on the composer's "genuinely original voice" and "freakishly structured tunes". All About Jazz reviewer John Barrett Jr. cautions that, though dissonant, this album is not the first of the free jazz movement with which Coleman is so associated. Nevertheless, in 2007, All About Jazz credited the album with introducing "a new era in jazz", transforming the genre by demonstrating a style of music "freed from the prevailing conventions of harmony, rhythm and melody".

Pianist Ethan Iverson has written at length about this album and other recordings from Coleman's early period. His argument is that on his early albums Coleman's attempts to break free of chords and chorus-structures are hampered by sidemen who are unwilling to follow his cue.

Release history
Originally released under the Contemporary imprint in mono and then later (either in 1959 or 1960) issued with a different cover photo and in stereo. The stereo remix of the album was re-released in 1992 on LP, compact disc and compact cassette in collaboration between Contemporary and OJC.

Track listing
All tracks composed by Ornette Coleman.
"Invisible" – 4:11
"The Blessing" – 4:45
"Jayne" – 7:17
"Chippie" – 5:37
"The Disguise" – 2:46
"Angel Voice" – 4:19
"Alpha" – 4:09
"When Will the Blues Leave?" – 4:58
"The Sphinx" – 4:13

Personnel
Ornette Coleman – alto saxophone
Don Cherry – cornet
Walter Norris – piano
Don Payne – double bass
Billy Higgins – drums
Lester Koenig – producer
Roy DuNann – engineer
Nat Hentoff – liner notes

References

1958 debut albums
Ornette Coleman albums
Contemporary Records albums